The diving competitions at the 2021 FINA Diving World Cup at Tokyo, Japan took place at the Tokyo Aquatics Centre from 1 to 6 May 2021. The event serves the final qualifying diving event for the 2020 Summer Olympics (top 4 non-qualified divers for synchronised events, top 18 non-qualified divers for individual events).

Schedule

Results

Synchronised

Men's Synchronised 3m springboard

Green denotes finalists

Divers bolded denotes they have qualified for Olympics by dint of this result

Men's Synchronised 10m platform

Green denotes finalists

Divers bolded denotes they have qualify for Olympics

Women's Synchronised 3m springboard

Green denotes finalists

Divers bolded denotes they have qualified for the Olympics

Women's Synchronised 10m platform

Green denotes finalists

Divers bolded denotes they have qualify for Olympics

Individual

Men's 3m springboard

Green denotes finalists

Blue denotes semifinalists

Divers bolded denotes they have qualify for Olympics via this result. Divers in the first 18 places unbolded have already qualified, or his nation has already reached its maximum allocation.

Men's 10m platform

Green denotes finalists

Blue denotes semifinalists

Divers bolded denotes they have qualify for Olympics (so far) via this result. Divers in the first 18 places unbolded have already qualified, or his nation has already reached its maximum allocation.

Women's 3m springboard

Green denotes finalists

Blue denotes semifinalists

Divers bolded denotes they have qualify for Olympics (so far) via this result. Divers in the first 18 places unbolded have already qualified, or his nation has already reached its maximum allocation.

Women's 10m platform

Green denotes finalists

Blue denotes semifinalists

Divers bolded denotes they have qualify for Olympics (so far) via this result. Divers in the first 18 places unbolded have already qualified, or his nation has already reached its maximum allocation.

References

2021 in Tokyo
FINA Diving World Cup
2021 in diving
Qualification for sports events
Qualification for the 2020 Summer Olympics